Michial "Mike" Foy (born February 24, 1962) is an American wrestler. He competed at the 1988 Summer Olympics and the 1992 Summer Olympics.

References

1962 births
Living people
American male sport wrestlers
Olympic wrestlers of the United States
Wrestlers at the 1988 Summer Olympics
Wrestlers at the 1992 Summer Olympics
Sportspeople from Chicago
Pan American Games medalists in wrestling
Pan American Games silver medalists for the United States
Wrestlers at the 1995 Pan American Games
20th-century American people